Band 3 anion transport protein, also known as anion exchanger 1 (AE1) or band 3  or solute carrier family 4 member 1 (SLC4A1), is a protein that is encoded by the  gene in humans.

Band 3 anion transport protein is a phylogenetically-preserved transport protein responsible for mediating the exchange of chloride (Cl−) with bicarbonate (HCO3−) across plasma membranes. Functionally similar members of the AE clade are AE2 and AE3.

Function 
Band 3 is present in the basolateral face of the α-intercalated cells of the collecting ducts of the nephron, which are the main acid-secreting cells of the kidney. They generate hydrogen ions and bicarbonate ions from carbon dioxide and water – a reaction catalysed by carbonic anhydrase. The hydrogen ions are pumped into the collecting duct tubule by vacuolar H+ ATPase, the apical proton pump, which thus excretes acid into the urine. kAE1 exchanges bicarbonate for chloride on the basolateral surface, essentially returning bicarbonate to the blood. Here it performs two functions:
 Electroneutral chloride and bicarbonate exchange across the plasma membrane on a one-for-one basis. This is crucial for CO2 uptake by the red blood cell and conversion (by hydration catalysed by carbonic anhydrase) into a proton and a bicarbonate ion. The bicarbonate is then excreted (in exchange for a chloride) from the cell by band 3.
 Physical linkage of the plasma membrane to the underlying membrane skeleton (via binding with ankyrin and protein 4.2). This appears to be to prevent membrane surface loss, rather than having to do with membrane skeleton assembly.

Distribution 
It is ubiquitous throughout the vertebrates. In mammals, it is present in two specific sites:
 the erythrocyte (red blood cell) cell membrane and
 the basolateral surface of the alpha-intercalated cell (the acid secreting cell type) in the collecting duct of the kidney.

Gene products 
The erythrocyte and kidney forms are different isoforms of the same protein.

The erythrocyte isoform of AE1, known as eAE1, is composed of 911 amino acids. eAE1 is an important structural component of the erythrocyte cell membrane, making up to 25% of the cell membrane surface. Each red cell contains approximately one million copies of eAE1.

The kidney isoform of AE1, known as kAE1 (which is 65 amino acids shorter than erythroid AE1) is found in the basolateral membrane of alpha-intercalated cells in the cortical collecting duct of the kidney.

Clinical significance 
Mutations of kidney AE1 cause distal (type 1) renal tubular acidosis, which is an inability to acidify the urine, even if the blood is too acidic. These mutations are disease causing as they cause mistargetting of the mutant band 3 proteins so that they are retained within the cell or occasionally addressed to the wrong (i.e. apical) surface.

Mutations of erythroid AE1 affecting the extracellular domains of the molecule may cause alterations in the individual's blood group, as band 3 determines the Diego antigen system (blood group).

More importantly erythroid AE1 mutations cause 15–25% of cases of hereditary spherocytosis (a disorder associated with progressive red cell membrane loss), and also cause the hereditary conditions of hereditary stomatocytosis and Southeast Asian ovalocytosis.

Interactions 
Band 3 has been shown to interact with CA2 and CA4.

Discovery 
AE1 was discovered following SDS-PAGE (sodium dodecyl sulfate polyacrylamide gel electrophoresis) of erythrocyte cell membrane. The large 'third' band on the electrophoresis gel represented AE1, which was thus initially termed 'Band 3'.

See also 
 Cluster of differentiation
 Anion exchanger family

References

Further reading

External links 
 Diego blood group system at BGMUT Blood Group Antigen Gene Mutation Database at NCBI, NIH
 
 
 

Blood proteins
Blood antigen systems
Enzymes
Clusters of differentiation
Solute carrier family
Transfusion medicine